The migrations of people and influences to the North from Karnataka during 10-12th century period is well attested by the sources but has not yet been studied carefully. This is known as "The Great Karnataka expansion"

Emergence of North Indian Dynasties
The Rashtrakutas of Manyakheta captured a region near Kannauj.

Around the same time the Sena Dynasty (1070–1225) ruled parts of Bengal, having arrived from Karnata. They were initially army officers in the kingdom of Pala Dynasty and later asserted themselves after the disintegration of the Pala dynasty.

The Eastern Ganga Dynasty who emerged in Odissa in 12th century were descendants of Western Ganga dynasty of Southern Karnataka who ruled that region between 300CE- 1000CE.

Nanyadeva founded the Karnat dynasty (1097 CE–1324 CE) of Mithila in modern-day North Bihar and parts of Nepal. He is thought to have had his origins in the Karnataka region and may have been a soldier in the Chalukaya army before settling in the Mithila. Certain chronicles refer to him as Karnata-Kulabhusana.

Vijayanagara empire

The Vijayanagara Empire often referred as Karnata Kingdom in the dynastic records in both foreign and Muslim accounts

Emergence of Other Kingdoms in India
The Vengi Chalukyas (Eastern Chalukyas) who ruled Andhra from the 7th century to the 11th. century and the Yadava Dynasty of Devagiri who ruled western India during 850-1320 C.E. were of Karnataka origin and encouraged Kannada language and literature in those regions for a significant period before switching to local languages.

Cultural influence
Karnataka had become a major cultural center at this time. Karnataka customs (fashions, coins, fans etc.) were copied as far as Kashmir.  King Harsha of Kashmir, who was a patron of culture, copied Karnataka customs, as mentioned by Kalhana in his Rajatarangini.

Worship of Goddess Durga and celebration of Durga festival also arrived in north India from Karnataka

Religious impact
Religious influence also arrived in North from south. Shankaracharya (about 788 - 820 C.E. according to most scholars), and some scholars of his lineage later on, established Advaita Mathas in North and Western India.

Some Jain influence also arrived in north from the South. In Karanataka, the Chalukyas, Kadambas and the Rashtrakutas were frequent supporters of Jainism (in general they supported all religions in their domain). Some Rashtrakutas were actually devout Jains.

A wife of Siddharaj Jayasimha (Chalukya of Analilvad) was from Karnataka. She was involved in a visit by a Jain Acharya from Karnataka, who debated local Acharyas in Patan, Gujarat. The Chaulukya ruler Kumarapala of Patan was a devout Jain.

Mention needs to be made that in the largest Jain community of Rajasthan and Gujarat, one of the original gotras is called Karnata. Balatkara Gana, a Jain order originating from Coastal Karnataka, was present in Chittor, Rajasthan in about 1300. In a few centuries it spread over much of North India.

Virashaivism, a religious movement started by Basava in the 12th century in northern Karnataka, spread not only in South India but also in Maharashtra. The followers of this sect are called Lingayats and worship Shiva.

The influence of Ramanuja (1017 - 1137 C.E.) and Madhvacharya (1199 - 1278 C.E.) also originated from Karnataka region. Ramanuja was Tamil, but was given shelter by the Hoysala Emperor Vishnuvardhana. The Kannada Haridasa movement which was popularised in the 14th.-16th. century by Purandara Dasa and Kanaka Dasa spread to North India as the Bhakti movement.

References

 Dr. Suryanath U. Kamat, Concise History of Karnataka, 2001, MCC, Bangalore (reprint 2002)
 Nilakanta Sastri, K.A. (1955). A History of South India, OUP, New Delhi (Reprinted 2002).
 Dr. Romila Thapar, History of Early India, From Origins to 1300 AD., Penguin, 2003, New Delhi.

History of Karnataka
Bhakti movement